The women's doubles of the 2016 Advantage Cars Prague Open tournament was played on clay in Prague, Czech Republic.

Kateřina Kramperová and Bernarda Pera were the defending champions, but Pera chose not to participate. Kramperová partnered Amandine Hesse, but they lost in the first round.

Demi Schuurs and Renata Voráčová won the title, defeating Sílvia Soler Espinosa and Sara Sorribes Tormo in the final, 7–5, 3–6, [10–4].

Seeds

Draw

References

External Links
 Draw

Advantage Cars Prague Open - Doubles
Advantage Cars Prague Open